The 1927–28 Pittsburgh Panthers men's basketball team represented the University of Pittsburgh during the 1927–28 NCAA men's basketball season in the United States. The head coach was Doc Carlson, coaching in his sixth season with the Panthers. The team finished the season with a 21–0 record.

The 1929 edition of The Owl yearbook notes that the team was "universally recognized as national champions, having hung up the best collegiate record in the country."

It is the only undefeated team in Pitt's history, and that season they were one of only two teams to finish with an unblemished record. Chuck Hyatt and Sykes Reed were named consensus All-Americans at the end of the season.

The team was retroactively named the national champion by the Helms Athletic Foundation and the Premo-Porretta Power Poll (the Panthers would receive retroactive recognition as the Helms national champion for the 1929–30 season as well).

Schedule and results

|-
!colspan=9 style="background:#091C44; color:#CEC499;" | Regular season

Source

References

Pittsburgh Panthers men's basketball seasons
Pittsburgh
NCAA Division I men's basketball tournament championship seasons
Pittsburgh Panthers Men's Basketball Team
Pittsburgh Panthers Men's Basketball Team